Siavash Kola (also Romanized as Sīāvash Kolā, Seyāvash Kolā, and Sīāvosh Kalā; also known as Sīāvash Kūlā) is a village in Qareh Toghan Rural District, in the Central District of Neka County, Mazandaran Province, Iran. At the 2006 census, its population was 756, in 198 families.

References 

Populated places in Neka County